"Feelin' the Feelin'" is a song written by David Bellamy, and recorded by American country music duo The Bellamy Brothers.  It was released in January 1986 as the third single from the album Howard & David.  The song reached No. 2 on the Billboard Hot Country Singles chart.

Chart performance

References

1986 singles
1985 songs
The Bellamy Brothers songs
Song recordings produced by Jimmy Bowen
Song recordings produced by Emory Gordy Jr.
MCA Records singles
Curb Records singles
Songs written by David Bellamy (singer)